Steensel is a village on the Gender stream in the municipality of Eersel, North Brabant, the Netherlands. Steensel is part of the Acht Zaligheden (Eight Beatitudes), along with Eersel, Knegsel, Duizel, Wintelre, Netersel, Hulsel en Reusel.

The name Steensel appeared first in a document from 1224, in which a certain Henricus and Marcelis were mentioned as knights of Steensel. In 1688, Steensel was plundered and destroyed by French soldiers. In 1810, Steensel became part of the municipality of Duizel and Steensel. Steensel was home to 282 people in 1840. In 1922, this municipality then merged into the municipality of Eersel.

Gallery

References 

Populated places in North Brabant
Eersel